Lisa McShea and Milagros Sequera were the defending champions, but Sequera did not compete this year. McShea teamed up with Claudine Schaul and lost in first round to tournament runners-up Iveta Benešová and Nuria Llagostera Vives.

Anabel Medina Garrigues and Dinara Safina won the title by defeating Iveta Benešová and Nuria Llagostera Vives 6–4, 2–6, 7–6(13–11) in the final.

Seeds

Draw

Draw

References
 Main Draw
 ITF tournament profile

Rosmalen Grass Court Championships
2005 WTA Tour